North Branch is an unincorporated community in Jewell County, Kansas, United States.  It is located 2 miles south of the Nebraska/Kansas state line at the intersection of Cedar Rd and 78 Rd.

History
Also known as Northbranch.  North Branch had a post office from the 1870s until 1959.

Education
The community is served by Rock Hills USD 107 public school district.

References

Further reading

External links
 Jewell County maps: Current, Historic, KDOT

Unincorporated communities in Jewell County, Kansas
Unincorporated communities in Kansas